Aloísio Lima (born 13 September 1973) is a Brazilian para table tennis player who competes at international table tennis competitions. He is a Paralympic bronze medalist, World bronze medalist, two-time Parapan American Games champion and a two-time Pan American silver medalist.

Lima became quadriplegic following an accident.

References

1973 births
Living people
Sportspeople from Brasília
Paralympic table tennis players of Brazil
Table tennis players at the 2016 Summer Paralympics
Medalists at the 2016 Summer Paralympics
Medalists at the 2015 Parapan American Games
Medalists at the 2019 Parapan American Games
Paralympic medalists in table tennis
Paralympic bronze medalists for Brazil
Brazilian male table tennis players
21st-century Brazilian people